Oswald Julen (15 February 1912 – December 1998) was a Swiss skier. He competed in the Nordic combined event at the 1936 Winter Olympics.

References

External links
 

1912 births
1998 deaths
Swiss male Nordic combined skiers
Olympic Nordic combined skiers of Switzerland
Nordic combined skiers at the 1936 Winter Olympics
People from Zermatt
Sportspeople from Valais